Pseudamnicola macrostoma is a species of very small freshwater snail with an operculum, an aquatic gastropod mollusc in the family Hydrobiidae.

Subspecies
Two subspecies are recognised, the nominotypical P. m. subsp. macrostoma and P. m. subsp. negropontina, the latter being treated as a distinct species (Pseudamnicola negropontina) by some authors.

Geographic distribution 
P. macrostoma is endemic to Greece. The species was originally described from a number of springs in the vicinity of Athens but was later also recorded from Evvia as well as several islands in the Aegean and Ionian seas.

References

Hydrobiidae
Gastropods of Europe
Endemic fauna of Greece
Gastropods described in 1853